Music, Music is the eighth studio album by Australian-American pop singer Helen Reddy that was released in the summer of 1976 by Capitol Records and later described by J. Scott McClintock for AllMusic: "There are breezy, Bacharach-ian excursions ('Gladiola,' 'You Make It So Easy'), bluesy numbers ('Get Off Me Baby,' 'Ladychain'), light country ('Mama'), jazzy ballads (Paul Williams' torchy contribution, 'Nice to Be Around'), and even a little Philly soul ('I Can't Hear You No More'). On August 2 of that year the Recording Industry Association of America awarded the album with Gold certification for sales of 500,000 copies in the United States. It debuted on ''Billboards Top LP's & Tapes chart that same month, in the issue dated August 14, and got as high as number 16 during its 13 weeks there, and in Canada's RPM magazine it peaked at number 14. The third album recorded by Reddy with producer Joe Wissert, Music, Music was cited in 1977 by Reddy as a personal favorite from among her albums. On August 23, 2005, Music, Music was released for the first time on compact disc as one of two Helen Reddy albums on one CD, the other album being her 1975 studio release, No Way to Treat a Lady.



Singles
"I Can't Hear You No More" was released in the United States on July 26, 1976, and debuted on Billboard'''s  Hot 100 in the issue of the magazine dated August 7, eventually making it to number 29 over the course of nine weeks. In the following issue, dated August 14, it made its first appearance on the magazine's Easy Listening chart, where it spent 11 weeks, one of which was at number one. In RPM magazine the song got as high as number 36 pop.

In Billboards August 28 issue the single's B-side, "Music Is My Life", started to be listed on the Hot 100 alongside "I Can't Hear You No More" as a "tag along" to indicate that some radio stations were opting to play the flip side of the original hit that charted. While "Music Is My Life" did not have any showings on the list of Easy Listening hits, a third song from the album, "Gladiola", began a 12-week chart run there in the issue dated November 13 of that year that included a number 10 peak position but saw no activity on the pop chart.

Track listing
Side 1
 "Music, Music" (Pamela Polland) – 3:14
Jeff Porcaro – drums
David Hungate – bass guitar 
Fred Tackett – guitar
David Paich – piano
Bobbye Hall – congas
 "Gladiola" (Alan Gordon) – 3:27
Harvey Mason – drums
Reini Press – bass guitar 
Dean Parks – guitar
Mark Jordan – piano
Victor Feldman – percussions
Tom Scott – alto sax solo
 "Mama" (Harriet Schock) – 4:03
Harvey Mason – drums
Scotty Edwards – bass guitar
Ray Parker Jr. – guitar
Clarence McDonald – piano
 "Hold Me in Your Dreams Tonight" (Marie Cain) – 2:42
Harvey Mason – drums
Reini Press – bass guitar 
Dean Parks – guitar
Mark Jordan – piano
Victor Feldman – percussions
 "Get Off Me Baby" (Jeff Langley, Holly Near) – 4:58
Harvey Mason – drums
Scotty Edwards – bass guitar
Ray Parker Jr. – guitar
Clarence McDonald – piano
Side 2
 "I Can't Hear You No More" (Gerry Goffin, Carole King) – 2:49
Harvey Mason – drums
Dean Parks – guitar
Scotty Edwards – bass guitar
Larry Muhoberac – piano
 "Ladychain" (Marcia Waldorf) – 3:58
Harvey Mason – drums
Scotty Edwards – bass guitar
Ray Parker Jr. – guitar
Clarence McDonald – piano
Tom Scott – alto sax solo
 "Music Is My Life" (Alan Gordon) – 2:29
Jeff Porcaro – drums
David Hungate – bass guitar 
Fred Tackett – guitar
David Paich – piano
Victor Feldman – percussions
 "Nice to Be Around" (John Williams, Paul Williams) – 2:58
Harvey Mason – drums
Reini Press – bass guitar 
Dean Parks – guitar
Mark Jordan – piano
Tom Scott – alto flute solo
 "You Make It So Easy" (Helen Reddy, Carole Bayer Sager) – 2:23
Harvey Mason – drums
Dean Parks – guitar
Scotty Edwards – bass guitar
Larry Muhoberac – piano

Charts

Personnel

Helen Reddy – vocals
Joe Wissert – producer 
Nick DeCaro – arranger and conductor 
Tom Perry – recording engineer
Mike Reese – mastering engineer
Jeff Wald – management
Francesco Scavullo – photography
Roy Kohara – art direction

 Additional musicians
Gary Grant – trumpet
Chuck Findley – trumpet
Bob Findley – trumpet
Steve Madiao – trumpet
Jay Daversa – trumpet 
Don Menza – saxophone
Tom Scott – saxophone
Bill Perkins – saxophone
Jay Migliori – saxophone
Jack Nimitz – saxophone 
Dick "Slyde" Hyde – trombone
Lou McCreary – trombone
Earl Dumler – oboe
Harry Bluestone – string concertmaster
Carolyn Willis – background vocals
Jim Gilstrap – background vocals
Myrna Matthews – background vocals
Oren Waters – background vocals
Lisa Roberts – background vocals
Nick DeCaro – background vocals
Frank DeCaro – contractor

Notes

References

 

1976 albums
Capitol Records albums
Helen Reddy albums
Albums produced by Joe Wissert